RNAS Pulham (later RAF Pulham) was a Royal Navy Air Service (RNAS) airship station, near Pulham St Mary  south of Norwich, UK. Though land was purchased by the Admiralty in 1912 the site was not operational until 1915.  From 1918 to 1958, the unit was a Royal Air Force establishment. The land today is in private ownership, and little remains above ground. However, the Pennoyer Centre in Pulham St Mary holds an extensive archive of photographs and memorabilia relating to the Air Station.

History
Pulham was one of the main British airship stations, with more than 3,000 men on the base at the end of the First World War. Initially it was used for airships that operated patrols over the North Sea (such as the Coastal and SS types) until their areas were taken over by seaplanes.

The R34 landed at RNAS Pulham to complete the first two-way flown crossing of the Atlantic in July 1919.

After the loss of the R101 in 1930 and the end of British airships the station was moved on to a care and maintenance basis only.

In its heyday Pulham had its own hydrogen plant, one small and two large airship sheds (one was later moved to Cardington base in 1930, the other was scrapped in 1948) and a permanent mooring mast.

During World War II, Pulham Air Station was used as an aircraft salvage yard. The RAF used Pulham for storage and Maintenance Unit work until closure in 1958.

See also 
RNAS Howden

References

Further reading

External links
 British Pathe film reel showing R33 taking off from Pulham
 British Pathe film reel showing R36 landing at Pulham

Pulham
Pulham